The 2014 FIBA World Championship for Women, the 17th edition of FIBA's premier international tournament for women's national basketball teams, was held in Ankara and Istanbul, Turkey from 27 September to 5 October 2014.

This tournament implemented the new expanded free throw lane, the restricted arc, and extended 3-point line (6.6–6.75 m).

The United States defended their title and won their ninth overall gold medal by beating Spain 77–64 in the final.
Australia defeated Turkey 74–44 to capture the bronze medal.

This was the last FIBA championship to use the name of "FIBA World Championship for Women". Shortly after the event, FIBA changed the name of the competition to the FIBA Women's Basketball World Cup, presumably to align its name with that of the corresponding men's competition.

Venues

Format
This years' competition saw a format change. The 16 teams were split into four groups of four teams and played each other in a round-robin system. After all games were played, the top team of each group advanced to the quarterfinals, while the 2nd and 3rd best team of each group played in an elimination round. The last placed team of each group was eliminated.

The winners of the elimination round advanced to the quarterfinals, while the losers were eliminated. From the quarterfinals on a knockout stage was used to determine the winner. The places 1 to 8 will be played out.

Qualification
16 teams took part in the 2014 World Championship for Women. After the 2012 Olympics, the continental allocation for FIBA Americas was reduced by one when the United States won the Olympic tournament, automatically qualifying them for the 2014 World Championship.

Squads

Draw
The draw was held on 15 March 2014. The 16 teams were allocated to four pots of four teams.

Seedings
Included are the respective FIBA World Rankings for women:

Preliminary round

All times are local (UTC+3).

Group A

|}

Group B

|}

Group C

|}

Group D

|}

Final round

5–8th place bracket

Elimination round

Quarterfinals

5–8th place semifinals

Semifinals

Seventh place game

Fifth place game

Third place game

Final

Final standings

Awards

All-Tournament Team
The all-star five was revealed on 5 October 2014.

 Maya Moore
 Brittney Griner
 Alba Torrens
 Sancho Lyttle
 Penny Taylor

Statistical leaders

Points

Rebounds

Assists

Blocks

Steals

Referees
The following referees were selected for the tournament.

  Fernando Sampietro
  Toni Caldwell
  Renaud Geller
  Guilherme Locatelli
  Karen Lasuik
  Wang Zebo
  José Fernández
  Robert Vyklický
  Carole Delauné
  Anne Panther
  Snehal Bendke
  Roberto Chiari
  Kim Bo-hui
  Tomas Jasevičius
  Jakub Zamojski
  Elena Chernova
  Babacar Guèye
  Jasmina Juras
  Antonio Conde
  Abdelaziz Abassi
  Serkan Emlek
  Özlem Yalman
  Yener Yılmaz
  Adrian Nunes
  Amy Bonner
  Roberto Oliveros

References

External links

 
2014
2014 in women's basketball
International women's basketball competitions hosted by Turkey
2014–15 in Turkish basketball
2014
2014
2010s in Ankara
2014 in Istanbul
2014 in Turkish women's sport